The Swiss Cup or Swiss Cup Zürich is an annual artistic gymnastics competition held in Zürich, Switzerland.  Unlike most artistic gymnastics competitions, the Swiss Cup is a mixed pairs event and features an elimination system. The first iteration was held in 1982.

Past champions

References 

Artistic gymnastics competitions
Annual sporting events in Switzerland
Recurring sporting events established in 1982